Gil Miranda Montilla (September 11, 1876 – July 20, 1946) was a Filipino politician who served as Speaker of the National Assembly from 1935 to 1938, and a member of the Philippine Senate 
from Negros Occidental from 1931 to 1935. Prior to his political career, he was president of the Isabela Sugar Company. A barangay and Gil Montilla National High School in Sipalay City are named after him.

See also
Politics of the Philippines

References

External links
 Official government profile

1876 births
1946 deaths
Senators of the 9th Philippine Legislature
Senators of the 10th Philippine Legislature
People from Negros Occidental
Speakers of the House of Representatives of the Philippines
Members of the House of Representatives of the Philippines from Negros Occidental
KALIBAPI politicians
Filipino collaborators with Imperial Japan
Nacionalista Party politicians
Members of the Philippine Legislature
Members of the National Assembly of the Philippines
Members of the National Assembly (Second Philippine Republic)
Governors of Negros Occidental